Roberto Leoni is an Italian screenwriter and film director best known for such films as Santa Sangre signed on Empire magazine's 2008 list of the 500 Greatest Movies Of All Time, The Master Touch starring Kirk Douglas, Street People starring Roger Moore, Casablanca Express starring Jason Connery, California starring Giuliano Gemma and Miguel Bosé, My Dear Killer starring William Berger and George Hilton.

Life and career 

Roberto Leoni was born in Rome and studied classics. While still a student at Sapienza University in Rome, he was awarded a grant by the C.U.T. (University Theatrical Center) and his collections of poems and short stories were published. An important producer made one of his short stories into a film, Eat it interpreted by Frank Wolff and the beginner Paolo Villaggio. His collection of poems won the Culture Award from the Italian Presidency of Ministries.
After serving as first AD for directors like Tonino Valerii and Luciano Salce, Roberto Leoni has written and directed a number of feature and short films including: The Guardians for Numero Tre Roma/Antenne Paris, Es Knallt - und die Engel singen with Les Humphries Singers as Butch Lion for Dieter Geissler, Film Monaco - distributed by Constantin Film, Dark Tale starring John Savage and Claudia Gerini – distributed by Sony Pictures Motion Picture Group, On the Right Side starring Catherine Spaak and Luca Ward for Union Contact/Rai 1 (Sidney Italian Australian Film Festival, Best Direction Award at Roma Film Festival and at Havana Film Festival, Cuba), The Great Artists (18X35’) series for G&I Editors – distributed by Rai Italia.

From August 2017 he reviews new and classic movies in his talk show Roberto Leoni Movie Reviews.

His last feature film just completed is De Serpentis Munere - The Serpent's Gift produced by Mario D'Andrea, starring Guglielmo Scilla, Alexandra Dinu, Benjamin Stender and Valentina Reggio.

Filmography

Film
 2021 - De Serpentis Munere - The Serpent's Gift (as writer and director) 
 2021 - Heartstruck (as writer and director) 
 2019 - Memory Island (as writer and director) 
 2016 - A Heart in the Drawer (as writer and director) under the auspices of Amnesty International Italy)
 2014 - The Gypsy Angel (as writer and director) 
 2012 - Miss Wolf and the Lamb (as writer and director) 
 2009 - Terminal (as writer and director) 
 2007 - Anita - Una vita per Garibaldi (as writer) 
 2005 - On the Right Side (as writer and director) 
 2005 - Raul (as writer) 
 2000 - Si fa presto a dire amore (as writer) 
 2000 - L'uomo della fortuna (as writer) 
 1998 - Frigidaire, il film (as writer) 
 1995 - Nefertiti (as writer) 
 1993 - 18.000 giorni fa (as writer) 
 1991 - Dark Tale (as writer and director)
 1990 - American Rickshaw (as writer) 
 1989 - Casablanca Express (as writer) 
 1989 - Santa Sangre (as writer) 
 1987 - Distant Lights (as writer) 
 1987 - Brothers in Blood (as writer) 
 1987 - Hell's Heroes (as writer) 
 1985 - La gabbia (as writer) 
 1985 - Wild Team (as writer) 
 1984 - Let's See It Clear (as writer) 
 1984 - The Final Executioner (as writer) 
 1982 - Vieni avanti cretino (as writer) 
 1978 - How to Lose a Wife and Find a Lover (as writer) 
 1977 - California (as writer)
 1976 - Street People (as writer)
 1976 - Pure as a Lily (as writer)
 1974 - Bang, and the Angels Sing (as writer and director) 
 1972 - The Master Touch (as writer)
 1972 - My Dear Killer (as writer)
 1968 - Eat it (as writer)

Television
 2007 - Gente di mare (TV series) (25 episodes - original idea)
 2005/2006 - Gente di mare (TV series) (26 episodes - original idea and writer)
 2003/2004 - The Great Artists (18 episodes - as writer and director)
 2002 - Vicious Game (TVmovie as writer) 
 2000 - The Framing Game (TVmovie as writer) 
 1999 - A High Price to Pay (TVmovie as writer) 
 1989 - Ocean (TV series) (6 episodes - as writer) 
 1974 - The Guardians (TVmovie as writer and director)

Web
 2017/- Roberto Leoni Movie Reviews (171 episodes - as writer director and main role)

References

External links

www.robertoleoni.com
Roberto Leoni YouTube channel
Roberto Leoni FBpage
Robert Leoni FilmTV
Roberto Leoni IMDB written reviews
Roberto Leoni LetterBox
Roberto Leoni Twitter
Roberto Leoni Telegram
Roberto Leoni Reddit

Italian screenwriters
Italian male screenwriters
Italian film directors
Italian-language film directors
Year of birth missing (living people)
Living people